Volodymyr Ivanovych Rybin (born 14 September 1980 in Kreminna) is a Ukrainian professional racing cyclist, who has achieved most success on both the track, where he was 2005 world champion in the points race. Rybin won a silver medal as well in the Madison in 2006 and has represented Ukraine at the 2004 and 2008 Summer Olympics.

Palmarès

External links 

1980 births
Living people
Cyclists at the 2004 Summer Olympics
Cyclists at the 2008 Summer Olympics
Olympic cyclists of Ukraine
UCI Track Cycling World Champions (men)
Ukrainian male cyclists
Ukrainian track cyclists
Sportspeople from Luhansk Oblast
21st-century Ukrainian people